Hylomys is a small genus of the family Erinaceidae. Hylomys species, like all species in the subfamily Galericinae, are known as gymnures or moonrats. Their closest relatives include the fossil Lantanotherium and Thaiagymnura and the living Neotetracus and Neohylomys. Members of this genus are found in Southeast Asia and Eastern Asia.

Species
 Hylomys engesseri Mein & Ginsburg, 1997 (fossil)
 Hylomys megalotis Jenkins & M. F. Robinson, 2002 (Long-eared gymnure)
 Hylomys parvus Robinson & Kloss, 1916 (Dwarf gymnure)
 Hylomys suillus S. Müller, 1840 (Short-tailed gymnure)

References

 
Gymnures
Mammal genera
Taxa named by Johannes Peter Müller